The King is a 2019 epic war film directed by David Michôd, based on several plays from William Shakespeare's Henriad. The screenplay was written by Michôd and Joel Edgerton, who both produced the film with Brad Pitt, Dede Gardner, Jeremy Kleiner, and Liz Watts. The King includes an ensemble cast led by Timothée Chalamet as the Prince of Wales and later King Henry V of England, alongside Edgerton, Sean Harris, Tom Glynn-Carney, Lily-Rose Depp, Thomasin McKenzie, Robert Pattinson, and Ben Mendelsohn.

The film focuses on the rise of Henry V as king after his father dies as he also must navigate palace politics, the war his father left behind, and the emotional strings of his past life. The King premiered at the 76th Venice International Film Festival on 2 September 2019, and was released digitally via Netflix on 11 October 2019. The film received generally favorable reviews from film critics but was criticized by historians for its inaccuracy to both the original plays and historical reality.

Plot
Henry, Prince of Wales, "Hal" (Timothée Chalamet), is the emotionally distant eldest son of King Henry IV of England (Ben Mendelsohn). Hal is uninterested in succeeding his father and spends his days drinking, whoring, and jesting with his companion John Falstaff (Joel Edgerton) in Eastcheap. Henry IV summons his son Hal and informs him that Hal's younger brother, Thomas (Dean Charles-Chapman), will inherit the throne. Thomas is sent to subdue Hotspur's Rebellion but is upstaged by the arrival of Hal, who challenges Hotspur to single combat. Although Hal kills Hotspur, ending the battle without further conflict, Thomas complains that Hal has stolen his glory. Shortly thereafter, Thomas is killed in battle after taking his campaign to Wales.

Henry IV dies in his bed with Hal present, and Hal is anointed King Henry V. Hal opts for peace and conciliation with his father's many adversaries, despite his actions being seen as weakness. At his coronation feast, the Dauphin of France (Robert Pattinson) sends Hal a ball as an insulting coronation gift. However, Hal chooses to frame this as a positive reflection of his boyhood. His sister Philippa (Thomasin McKenzie), now the Queen of Denmark, cautions that nobles in any royal court have their own interests in mind and will never fully reveal their true intentions.

Hal interrogates a captured assassin who claims to have been sent by King Charles VI of France to assassinate Hal. The English nobles Cambridge (Edward Ashley) and Grey (Stephen Fewell) are approached by French agents hoping to induce them to the French cause. Their trust in the new young king wavers, and they then approach Hal's Chief Justice, William Gascoigne (Sean Harris), with their concerns. Gascoigne advises Hal that a show of strength is necessary to unite England, so Hal declares war on France and has Cambridge and Grey beheaded. He approaches Falstaff and appoints him as his chief military strategist, saying that Falstaff is the only man he truly trusts.

The English army sets sail for France. After completing the Siege of Harfleur, they continue on the campaign but are taunted by the Dauphin. The English advance parties stumble upon a vast French army gathering to face them. Dorset (Steven Elder) advises Hal to retreat, but Falstaff proposes a false advance to lure the French to rush forward into the muddy battlefield, where they will be weighed down by their heavy armour and horses. They will then be attacked by the English longbowmen and surrounded by a large, lightly armoured flanking force hidden in the nearby woods.

Falstaff insists on leading the dangerous false advance, as it was his plan, prompting Hal to challenge the Dauphin to single combat to decide the battle and minimize bloodshed; however, the Dauphin refuses. The Battle of Agincourt commences. Falstaff's plan works – the bulk of the French army charges to engage Falstaff's force and is soon mired in the mud. Hal leads the flanking attack, and the outnumbered but far more mobile English army overpowers the immobilized French, though Falstaff is killed. The Dauphin, still fresh and in heavy armour, reinvokes Hal's challenge but repeatedly slips and falls in the mud until Hal permits his soldiers to kill him. Hal orders all French prisoners executed for fear that they might regroup, an order that Falstaff had refused to carry out following the Siege of Harfleur.

Hal reaches King Charles VI, who offers his surrender, makes him his heir, and offers him the hand of his daughter Catherine of Valois. Hal returns to England with his new wife for the celebrations. In private, she challenges his reasons for invading France and denies the supposed French actions against Hal, suggesting the assassin was a plot from within his own court. Suspicious, Hal confronts Gascoigne, who confesses that he had staged the insult and acts of aggression and declares that true peace comes only through victory. In cold fury, Hal stabs Gascoigne in the head, killing him, and returns to Catherine, asking that she promise to always speak the truth to him, as clearly as possible.

Cast

Production

Development
In 2013, it was revealed that Joel Edgerton and David Michôd had collaborated on writing an adaptation of Shakespeare's "Henriad" plays, Henry IV, Parts 1 & 2 and Henry V, for Warner Bros. Pictures. In September 2015, it was announced that Michôd would direct the project, with Warner Bros. producing and distributing the film, and Lava Bear producing.

Casting
In February 2018, Timothée Chalamet joined the cast, with Brad Pitt, Dede Gardner, and Jeremy Kleiner producing, alongside Liz Watts, under their Plan B Entertainment banner. Ultimately, Netflix distributed the film instead of Warner Bros. In March 2018, Edgerton joined the cast of the film. In May 2018, Robert Pattinson, Ben Mendelsohn, Sean Harris, Lily-Rose Depp, Tom Glynn-Carney, and Thomasin McKenzie joined the cast; Dean-Charles Chapman joined in June.

Filming 
Principal photography began on 1 June 2018 and wrapped on 24 August. Filming took place throughout England and at Szilvásvárad, Hungary. Many scenes were filmed on location at Berkeley Castle in Gloucestershire, England. Lincoln Cathedral was used in place of Westminster Abbey for the coronation scenes.

Music 

The film's original score was composed by Nicholas Britell, who thought of approaching the film's music from the 21st century, instead of the medieval 15th century approach, saying "because of the timelessness of these issues, if felt like something that we could explore with the sound of different time periods, just to make you look at the early 1400’s in a way that it felt like you hadn’t seen it before". He felt that the "1400s looks like it was a foreign planet". He experimented the film's music using bass clarinets run with tape filters, and sounds of metal while composing. It was Britell's most "dark and sombre" music reflecting the zone of the film. Lakeshore Records released the album consisting of 15 tracks from Britell's score, on 1 November 2019 in digital and CD formats, while the vinyl edition was released three years later on 8 July 2022.

Release
The film had its world premiere at the Venice Film Festival on 2 September 2019. It screened at the BFI London Film Festival on 3 October 2019, and received a limited release on 11 October 2019 before being released on Netflix, for digital streaming, on 1 November 2019.

Reception

Critical response
The website's critical consensus reads: "While The King is sometimes less than the sum of its impressive parts, strong source material and gripping performances make this a period drama worth hailing." Metacritic, which uses a weighted average, assigned the film a score of 62 out of 100, based on 38 critics, indicating "generally favorable reviews".

Accolades

Historical accuracy 
The film was criticized for being widely inaccurate to both reality and the Shakespearean play. Being loosely based on several works by Shakespeare, the film contains many of the same ahistorical dramatizations and biases as its source material, including the introduction of some wholly-fictional characters and episodes as well as mischaracterizations of historical persons, not the least of which being Henry himself. Portrayed as a perpetually-inebriated sullen ne'er-do-well, Henry of Monmouth was in real life so engaged and experienced in battle that he almost died from an arrow to the face, which was subtly referenced by the facial scar he wears in the film. Like the 16th-century plays, the film was met with criticism by historians, with Christophe Gilliot, the director of the French museum Azincourt 1415, suggesting it has "Francophobe tendencies".

The following is a non-exhaustive list of the most important historical inaccuracies present in the film that do not correspond to reality according to Gilliot:

 King Henry V was neither humanist nor pacifist. The real Henry V was known to be bellicose, aggressive and warlike. The war against France was not solely the result of a plot against the King but also a continuity of the foreign policy of his ancestors, who claimed the rights of the English crown to the throne of France. Henry wanted to establish his legitimacy and reduced the population of Rouen to starvation during the siege of the city from July 1418 to January 1419, which killed 35,000 in six months.
 William Gascoigne was not killed by Henry V but dismissed by him from the start of his reign for being considered too close to his father.
 Henry V never gave up his responsibilities as Prince of Wales, and it was not the death of his brother that pushed him to accept the crown. Furthermore, his brother Prince Thomas died not in Wales but during the Battle of Baugé in Anjou, France, eight years after Henry V's coronation.
 The Dauphin of France, Louis de Guyenne, was not present at the Siege of Harfleur or the Battle of Agincourt. In addition, the film version of the character, interpreted by Robert Pattinson, is far from reality. Presented as an arrogant, silly and brutal character, the Dauphin, who died two months after the battle of Agincourt, was in fact a pious young man in fragile health.
 The Battle of Agincourt took place not in such a hilly and green place, as the film shows, but on fallow fields and plowing in the plains. In addition, it was the English who held the heights although the film suggests that it was the French.
 Falstaff, a fictional character, was of course not the strategist of the battle and neither took part in nor died at the battle.
 A crucial part of the English defence, the sharpened stakes, or palings, which were set at an angle towards the French cavalry to protect the archers, was almost entirely ignored in the film although there was a brief shot of a small pile of palings awaiting deployment.
 The film's costume design consists of numerous anachronisms and inaccuracies, consisting of armor and clothing from the entirety of the fifteenth century not present during the films period, alongside entirely ahistorical designs.

See also 

 Chimes at Midnight, a film adaptation of the Henriad by Orson Welles from 1965
 Henry V, the fourth episode of the 2012 TV series The Hollow Crown, covering roughly the same material and themes.

References

External links
 
 

2019 films
2010s historical drama films
American historical drama films
Australian historical drama films
Plan B Entertainment films
Films based on Henry IV (play)
Films based on Henry V (play)
Films directed by David Michôd
Films produced by Brad Pitt
Films set in England
Films set in the 15th century
Films shot in London
Films shot in Lincolnshire
Films shot in Cardiff
Films shot in Derbyshire
Films shot in Bristol
Films shot in Budapest
Films about royalty
English-language Netflix original films
Films produced by Joel Edgerton
Films with screenplays by Joel Edgerton
Films scored by Nicholas Britell
Hundred Years' War films
2019 drama films
Biographical films about British royalty
2010s English-language films
2010s American films